This list of Welsh writers is an incomplete alphabetical list of writers from Wales. 

It includes writers in all literary genres, writing in English, Welsh, Latin, or any other language, who have a Wikipedia page. Description as a writer precedes other occupations. It is a subsidiary to the List of Welsh people. See also List of Welsh-language authors, List of Welsh women writers and List of Welsh-language poets (6th century to c. 1600). Abbreviations: c. = about, fl. = active; B = writing in Brythonic, C = writing in Chinese, E = writing in English (including Middle English), F = writing in French, G = writing in German, L = writing in Latin, sl = writing in sign language, W = writing in Welsh (including Middle Welsh).

A

B

C

D

E

F

G

H

I

J

Angharad James (1677–1749, W), poet and harpist
Bill James (James Tucker, born 1929, E), novelist
Christine James (living, W), poet and academic
Daniel James (Gwyrosydd, 1848–1920, W), poet and hymnist
Edward James (c. 1569 – c. 1610, W), translator and priest
Evan James (Euan ap Iago, 1809–1878, W), poet and lyricist
Henry James (1864–1949, W), religious writer and dean
Maria James (1793–1868, E), poet
Siân James (1930–2021, E), novelist
Marguerite Florence Laura Jarvis (Oliver Sandys, 1886–1964, E), novelist and actress
David Jenkins (1912–2002, EW), non-fiction writer and librarian
John Jenkins (Gwili, 1872–1936, W), poet and theologian
Joseph Jenkins (1818–1898, EW), diarist and poet
Mike Jenkins (born 1953, E), poet and fiction writer
Nigel Jenkins (1949–2014, E), poet and non-fiction writer
Robert Thomas Jenkins (1881–1969, EW), historian and academic
John Thomas Job (1867–1938, W), hymnist, poet and minister
Brian John (born 1940, E), novelist and non-fiction writer
Godfrey John (living, E), poet and essayist
Griffith John (1831–1912, CE), translator and evangelist
Alice Gray Jones (1852–1943, W), writer and editor
Bedwyr Lewis Jones (1933–1992, EW), scholar, critic and linguist
Bobi Jones (Robert Maynard Jones, 1929–2017, W), writer and academic
Cynan Jones (born 1975, E), novelist
D. Gwenallt Jones (1899–1968, W), poet, critic and scholar
Dafydd Jones (Dewi Dywyll, 1803–1868, W), balladeer
David Jones (1765–1816, E), religious writer and barrister
David Jones (1895–1974, E), poet and painter
Dic Jones (1934–2009, W), poet
Eifion Jones (1925–2004, E), science writer and marine biologist
Elwyn Jones (1923–1982, E), television screenwriter and novelist
Ernest Jones (1879–1958, E), biographer and psychoanalyst
Glyn Jones (1905–1995, E), novelist, poet and literary historian
Griffith Jones (1684–1761, EW), religious writer and promoter of literacy
Gwilym R. Jones (1903–1993, W), editor and poet
Gwyn Jones (1907–1999, E), novelist and translator
Harri Pritchard Jones (1933–2015, EW), poet, critic and psychiatrist
Harry Longueville Jones (1806–1870, E), archaeologist and schools inspector
Idwal Jones (1887–1964, E), novelist and non-fiction writer
Jack Jones (1884–1970, E), novelist
Jack Jones (born 1992, E), poet and singer
John Jones (Jac Glan-y-gors, 1766–1821, W), satirical poet and pamphleteer
John Chris Jones (born 1927, E), designer and writer on design
John Hugh Jones (1843–1910, W), translator and priest
John Robert Jones (1911–1970, EW), philosopher
Jonah Jones (1919–2004, E), writer and sculptor
Lewis Jones (1836–1904, W), writer and settler in Patagonia
Lewis Jones (1897–1939, EW), writer and left-wing activist
Mary Vaughan Jones (1918–1983, W), children's writer and educator
Maurice Jones (1863–1957, W), bard, cleric and academic
Owen Jones (1741–1814, EW), antiquary
Owen Jones (1838–1866), school teacher and writer
Owen Wynne Jones (Glasynys, 1828–1870, W), writer, schoolteacher and cleric
Patrick Jones (born 1965, E), poet and playwright
Steve Jones (born 1944, E), science writer and geneticist
T. Gwynn Jones (1871–1949, EW), poet, novelist and translator
T. James Jones (born 1934, W), poet and dramatist
T. Llew Jones (1915–2009, W), poet and children's writer
Terry Jones (1942–2020, E), writer, screenwriter and film-maker
Thomas Jones (1756–1820, EW), writer, poet and minister
William Jones (1746–1794, E), philologist

K

L

M

N

O

P

R

S

T

V

W

Y

Works by non-Welsh writers set mainly in Wales

References

See also
List of Welsh language authors
List of Welsh language poets (6th century to c.1600)
List of Welsh women writers
Welsh-language literature
Welsh literature in English
:Category:Welsh writers

Lists of British writers
Writers
 
Lists of writers by nationality